is a train station in Sakurai, Nara Prefecture, Japan, operated by Kintetsu Railway.

Line
Hasedera Station is served by the Osaka Line.

Layout
The station has two side platforms serving one track each.

Platforms

Adjacent stations

See also
 List of railway stations in Japan

External links

  

Railway stations in Nara Prefecture